FK Slovan Duslo Šaľa is a Slovak football team, based in the town of Šaľa.

Notable Managers
 Vladimír Goffa (2014)
 Ladislav Molnár (2014–2015)
 Libor Fašiang (2015)
 Peter Gergely (2015–2016)

Women team
FK Slovan Duslo Šaľa

References

External links 

Official website 

 
Slovan Sala
Association football clubs established in 1921
1921 establishments in Slovakia